Kagoy may refer to:
 Qəğoy, Azerbaijan
 Këkoy, Kyrgyzstan